M. T. B. Nagaraj (b 1952) is an Indian politician from Karnataka state and  who is the current Minister of Small Scale Industries and Municipal Administration of Karnataka from 4 August 2021. He is a member of Karnataka Legislative Council from Bharatiya Janata Party since 2020. Also he was district incharge of Bangalore Rural District from 24 June 2021 to date.

He was elected to Karnataka Vidhan Sabha from Hosakote (Vidhan Sabha constituency) as a Congress candidate in 2004, 2013 and 2018. He lost in 2008. He resigned from Congress in 2019, joined BJP, and contested again from Hosakote only to be defeated by the rebel BJP candidate Sharath Gowda. But BJP got him elected to the Legislative Council in 2020.

M. T. B. Nagaraj was one of the seventeen rebel MLAs who were disqualified by Speaker Ramesh Kumar of Karnataka Assembly for anti-party activities.

References

1952 births
Living people
Bharatiya Janata Party politicians from Karnataka
Indian National Congress politicians from Karnataka
People from Bangalore
Karnataka MLAs 2018–2023
Karnataka MLAs 2004–2007
Karnataka MLAs 2013–2018